Penyu Islands is part of Molucca Islands, located at the south of Strait of Manipa near Ceram.  To the west is Lucipara Islands, to the east is Banda Islands and the south Barat Daya Islands.

Archipelagoes of Indonesia